Thomas Proffitt (born 13 July 1927) is an English former boxer who competed for Great Britain in the 1948 Summer Olympics. He fought as Tommy Proffitt.

Boxing career
Proffitt competed in the bantamweight division at the 1948 Olympic Games, losing in the round of 32.

1948 Olympic results
 Round of 32: lost to Edel Ojeda (Mexico) by decision

He won the 1948 Amateur Boxing Association British bantamweight title, when boxing out of the LNER ABC.

References

1927 births
Living people
English male boxers
Olympic boxers of Great Britain
Boxers at the 1948 Summer Olympics
Bantamweight boxers